Pinnacle High School is a public high school located in the north valley of Phoenix, Maricopa County, Arizona. PHS opened in 2000, and is a part of the Paradise Valley Unified School District (PVUSD). The students are called Pinnacle Pioneers and the school's mascot is Pioneer Pete. The school's main colors are blue and white, however in recent years, red has been added as a school color.

Campus 
Pinnacle High School's campus includes eight buildings, two baseball fields, two softball fields, one football field, two practice football fields, two lacrosse fields, a track, eight tennis courts, ten batting/racquetball cages, a student parking lot, and a staff parking lot. Notable buildings include two-story classroom structures, a gymnasium, and an auditorium.

Pinnacle High School address: 3535 East Mayo Blvd. Phoenix, AZ 85050

Demographics

The demographic breakdown of the 2,463 students enrolled in the 2015–2016 school year was:

Male - 52.3%
Female - 47.7%
Native American/Alaskan - 0.4%
Asian/Pacific islanders - 3.7%
Black - 1.8%
Hispanic - 11.5%
White - 78.6%
Multiracial - 4.0%

7.1% of the students were eligible for free or reduced-cost lunch. For 2015–2016, Pinnacle was a Title I school.

Notable alumni
 Brett Nicholas (2007) – professional baseball player
 Mason Robertson (2013) – professional soccer player
 Sydney Wiese (2013) – professional women's basketball player
 Brian Lewerke (2015) – former professional football player
 Nico Mannion (2019) – basketball player for the Virtus Bologna of the Italian Lega Basket Serie A (LBA)
 Spencer Rattler (2019) – college football quarterback

References

External links
 
Paradise Valley Unified School District

Public high schools in Arizona
High schools in Phoenix, Arizona
Educational institutions established in 2000
2000 establishments in Arizona